Princesse Shéhérazade (lit: Princess Sheherazade) was a French animated television series originally broadcast from 1996 until 2000 on the French TV channel France 2. It was later retransmitted in 2008 on channel France 5. Its production had the participation of the National Center of Cinematography and the support of Région Poitou Charentes. The opening theme was composed by Gérard Pullicino and was sung by Amina Annabi on its original version.

Characters 
 Shéhérazade
 Till
 Nour
 Fahrid
 Prince Silmane

References

External links 
 

1996 French television series debuts
1999 French television series endings
French children's animated adventure television series
French children's animated comedy television series
French children's animated fantasy television series